Apati is a village in Kargil district of the Indian union territory of Ladakh. It is close to the India–Pakistan border (LOC). The village is located 19 kilometres east of Kargil in the Sod Valley on the bank of the Tumel Lungpa stream. Near the village is an ancient Maitreya Buddha statue from 7th–11th centuries carved on a mountain rock.

Demographics

According to the 2011 census of India, Apati has a population of 1245 people living in 142 households.

Transport
Apati served by the Kargalik–Batalik–Khaltse Road, which passes by the north of the village. Kargil is 19 km away from Apati and Batalik is 41 km away.

The nearest major railway stations to Hardas is the Srinagar railway station located at a distance of 223 kilometres.

The nearest airport is at Kargil located at a distance of 18 kilometres but it is currently not operational. The next nearest major airports are Srinagar International Airport and Leh Airport located at a distance of 219 kilometres and 225 kilometres.

Maps

See also
Hunderman

Notes

References

Bibliography 
 
 
 

Villages in Kargil tehsil